Askeröds IF is a sports club in Askeröd, Sweden, established in 1944.

The women's soccer team played in the Swedish top division in 1978.

References

External links
Official website 

1944 establishments in Sweden
Football clubs in Skåne County
Association football clubs established in 1944